Songo – La Maya is a municipality in the Santiago de Cuba Province of Cuba. It is located north-east of Santiago de Cuba and is centered on the towns of La Maya (municipal seat) and Alto Songo (or Songo).

History
In 1943, the municipality consisted of the barrios (neighbourhoods) of Florida Blanca, Jarahueca, La Maya, La Sabana, Morón, Norte Cabecera, Palenque, Socorro, Sur Cabecera and Tí Arriba.

Geography
The municipality is located east of the province, neighboring the provinces of Holguín and Guantánamo; and borders with the municipalities of San Luis, Mayarí, Segundo Frente, El Salvador, Niceto Pérez and Santiago de Cuba.

It includes the town of La Maya and the villages of Alto Songo, Belleza, Bolaño, El Manguito, El Piñon, Jagua, Jarahueca, Jurisdicción, Jutinicú, La Perla, La Prueba, La Sabana, Los Reynaldos, Matahambre, Palmarejo, Río Arriba, San Benito del Crucero, Santa Cruz and Yerba de Guinea.

Demographics
In 2004, the municipality of Songo – La Maya had a population of 100,287.

See also
List of cities in Cuba

References

External links

Populated places in Santiago de Cuba Province